Ferdows is a city in South Khorasan Province in Iran

Ferdows may also refer to:
Ferdows, Jiroft, a village in Kerman Province, Iran
Ferdows, Narmashir, a village in Kerman Province, Iran
Ferdows, Rigan, a village in Kerman Province, Iran
Ferdows, Razavi Khorasan, a village in Razavi Khorasan province in Iran
Ferdows County, a county in South Khorasan province in Iran
Ferdowsieh, formerly Ferdows, a city near Tehran, Iran
Ferdows Boulevard, a boulevard in the west of Tehran, Iran
Bagh-e Ferdows, a historical complex of garden palaces in Tajrish, Iran
Ferdows Rural District (disambiguation), administrative subdivisions of Iran